Eric Samuel André (born April 4, 1983) is an American stand-up comedian, actor, producer, television host and writer. He is best known as the creator, host, and co-writer of the Adult Swim comedy series The Eric Andre Show (2012–present). He also played Mike on the FXX series Man Seeking Woman (2015–2017) and voiced Azizi in the remake of The Lion King (2019). He performs music under the name Blarf.

Early life and education
André was born in Boca Raton, Florida on April 4, 1983, the son of an American Ashkenazi Jewish mother from the Upper West Side of New York City's Manhattan borough and an Afro-Haitian immigrant father who worked as a psychiatrist. He identifies as both Black and Jewish. In 2001, after graduating from Dreyfoos School of the Arts in West Palm Beach, Florida, Andre studied at Berklee College of Music in Boston, where he played the double bass and graduated in 2005 with a Bachelor of Music.

Career

André began his comedy career in 2003. He is the creator and host of The Eric Andre Show, a parody of public access talk shows, on Cartoon Network's late night programming block Adult Swim. The show features pranks, shock humor, sketches, and celebrity interviews. He co-starred as Mark on the ABC comedy series Don't Trust the B---- in Apartment 23, and guest-starred on 2 Broke Girls as Deke, Max's love interest and fellow pastry student. He played Mike in the FXX comedy series Man Seeking Woman, which premiered in 2015. The show's third and final season, consisting of ten episodes, ran in early 2017.

In 2015, on SiriusXM with Howard Stern he became the first man to have ever ridden the sybian on live broadcasting.

He voices Luci in the Netflix animated show Disenchantment. In May 2020, André announced his first standup special on Netflix, Legalize Everything, which was released on June 23, 2020. In 2021, André starred in the Netflix prank comedy film Bad Trip.

Personal life 
André dated actress Rosario Dawson from 2016 to 2017. In March 2021, André revealed he was in a relationship with a woman that he met at a farmer's market and that she did not know he was famous until after they started dating.

André is an agnostic atheist and a practitioner of Transcendental Meditation. He endorsed Democratic candidate Bernie Sanders in the 2020 presidential election.

In a 2016 interview, André said: "I think everyone is bi, right? There's no such thing as sexual orientation, or race, or gender. Those are all obsolete man-made concepts. I'll say it again, a hole is a hole." When asked if he was coming out as bisexual, he continued: "I'll fuck anything that moves."

On October 11, 2022, André, along with comedian Clayton English, filed a federal lawsuit against Clayton County, Georgia, claiming that they were subjected to a police program that, without reasonable suspicion, racially profiled, coerced, and illegally searched passengers boarding planes for drugs at Hartsfield-Jackson Atlanta International Airport. Their lawsuit challenges the constitutionality of the program.

Filmography

Film

Television

Web

Discography

Albums

Guest appearances

References

External links

The Eric Andre Show at Adult Swim
 
 
 
 BLARF Stones Throw Records

1983 births
Living people
21st-century American comedians
21st-century American male actors
21st-century American male musicians
21st-century double-bassists
African-American atheists
African-American Jews
African-American male comedians
American male comedians
African-American stand-up comedians
African-American television talk show hosts
American Ashkenazi Jews
American television talk show hosts
American double-bassists
American male film actors
American male television actors
American male television writers
American male voice actors
American people of Haitian descent
American sketch comedians
American stand-up comedians
American television writers
Berklee College of Music alumni
Comedians from Florida
Haitian-American male actors
Jewish American entertainers
Jewish American male actors
Jewish American male comedians
Jewish American atheists
Jewish male comedians
Male actors from Florida
Male double-bassists
People from Boca Raton, Florida
Screenwriters from Florida
Showrunners
Surreal comedy